The 1999–2000 season was Chelsea F.C.'s 86th competitive season, eighth consecutive season in the FA Premier League and 94th year as a club.

Season summary
After a very good third-place finish last season, Chelsea qualified for the Champions League third qualifying round, and were expected to go one better and win the title. France captain Didier Deschamps was signed for £3 million from Juventus to add even more quality and experience to a Chelsea midfield that already boasted Dennis Wise, Roberto Di Matteo and Gustavo Poyet. Blackburn Rovers striker Chris Sutton was also signed for £10 million, but he proved to be a flop with only one league goal all season, which came in a 5-0 drubbing of Man Utd at Stamford Bridge. His strike partner, Gianfranco Zola, had a poor league season by his standard, scoring just four goals, but he made up for that by again setting up many more goals for the team. Chelsea opened the season with 4–0 win over newly promoted Sunderland with Gus Poyet scoring a stunning scissors kick goal. Zola, in contrast to his average league form, made Europe sit up and notice as he led Chelsea's Champions league debut appearance in the group stage. Chelsea were drawn against AC Milan, Hertha Berlin and Galatasary with their first game being against AC Milan at Stamford Bridge. Chelsea topped Group H with 11 points after some standout performances, particularly an impressive 5–0 win in Turkey and two creditable draws home and away with AC Milan.

Zola scored a spectacular free kick in a 3–1 win over F.C. Barcelona at Stamford Bridge, but Chelsea were eliminated in the second leg at the Nou Camp. On the Premier league front, Gianluca Vialli's side finished a solid fifth place in the final table but were too inconsistent to mount anything like a title challenge. Chelsea won their fourth cup in four seasons with a 1–0 win over Aston Villa at Wembley, after David James dropped the ball from a Chelsea corner allowing Di Matteo to score. Chelsea had the last cup final triumph at the old Wembley stadium before it was rebuilt. Gus Poyet was key during Chelsea's FA cup run, scoring a hat trick against Hull at Boothferry Park in a 6–1 win and netting twice against Newcastle at Wembley.

On 26 December 1999, in their 1–2 away win over Southampton, Chelsea became the first team in the Football League history to field a starting eleven without an English player. The squad was made up of: Ed de Goey, Albert Ferrer, Franck Leboeuf, Emerson Thome, Celestine Babayaro, Deschamps, Dan Petrescu, Di Matteo, Poyet, Gabriele Ambrosetti and Tore André Flo.

Final league table

Results summary

Results by round

Results

FA Premier League

UEFA Champions League

Third qualifying round

First group stage

Second group stage

Quarter-finals

Football League Cup

FA Cup

First team squad
Squad at end of season

Left club during season

Statistics

|}

Statistics taken from.

Transfers

In
  Didier Deschamps –  Juventus, 13 June, £3,000,000
  Mario Melchiot –  Ajax, 14 June, free
  Chris Sutton –  Blackburn Rovers, 5 July, £10,000,000
  Jes Høgh –  Fenerbahçe, 8 July, £300,000
  Gabriele Ambrosetti –  Vicenza, 13 August, £3,500,000
  Stuart Reddington -  Lincoln United, 26 August, £75,000
  Emerson Thome –  Sheffield Wednesday, 23 December, £2,500,000
  George Weah –  Milan 11 January, Loan

Out
 Brian Laudrup -  Ajax, 14 June, £2,000,000
  Dmitri Kharine –  Celtic, 22 June, free
  Eddie Newton –  Birmingham City, 2 July, free  
  Andy Myers –  Bradford City, 8 July, £800,000
  Michael Duberry –  Leeds United, 9 July, £4,500,000
  Steve Hampshire -  Dunfermline Athletic, 7 January, free
  Bjarne Goldbæk –  Fulham, 15 January, £650,000
  Joe Sheerin -  AFC Bournemouth, 26 February, free
  Paul Hughes -  Southampton, 23 March, free

References

External links
 Chelsea FC Official Website
 Chelsea FC on Soccerbase
 Chelsea FC on BBC

Chelsea F.C. seasons
Chelsea